Caesium ozonide (CsO3) is an oxygen-rich compound of caesium. It is an ozonide, meaning it contains the ozonide anion (O3−). It can be formed by reacting ozone with caesium superoxide:

CsO2 + O3 -> CsO3 + O2

The compound will react strongly with any water in the air forming caesium hydroxide.

2 CsO3 + H2O -> 2CsOH + 5/2O2

If heated to between 70 and 100 °C, caesium ozonide will quickly decompose to caesium superoxide (CsO2). In fact, the compound is metastable to decomposition into caesium superoxide, slowly decomposing at room temperature, but can remain intact for months if stored at -20 °C.

Above around 8 °C, the crystal structure is of the caesium chloride type, with the ozonide in place of the chloride ion. At lower temperatures, the crystal structure changes to a structure identical to rubidium ozonide (RbO3), with space group P21/c.

References

Caesium compounds
Ozonides